Lauri Vuorinen (born 1 January 1995) is a Finnish cross-country skier. He competed in the 2018 Winter Olympics.

Cross-country skiing results
All results are sourced from the International Ski Federation (FIS).

Olympic Games

Distance reduced to 30 km due to weather conditions.

World Championships

World Cup

Season standings

References

External links
 
 

1995 births
Living people
People from Salo, Finland
Finnish male cross-country skiers
Olympic cross-country skiers of Finland
Cross-country skiers at the 2018 Winter Olympics
Cross-country skiers at the 2022 Winter Olympics
Sportspeople from Southwest Finland
21st-century Finnish people